Boxing was one of the many sports which was held at the 2002 Asian Games in Masan Gymnasium, Masan, South Korea between 2 and 13 October 2002.

The competition included only men's events.

Schedule

Medalists

Medal table

Participating nations
A total of 161 athletes from 32 nations competed in boxing at the 2002 Asian Games:

References

2002 Asian Games Report, Pages 330–341

External links
Official website

 
2002 Asian Games events
2002
Asian Games
2002 Asian Games